Sergey Vasilevich Chervyakov (born 12 January 1959 in Moscow) is a Soviet Nordic combined skier who competed from 1982 to 1987. He won a bronze medal in the 3x10 km team event at the 1987 FIS Nordic World Ski Championships in Oberstdorf and finished tenth in the 15 km individual at Seefeld in 1985.

Chervyakov finished 12th in the individual event at the 1984 Winter Olympics in Sarajevo. His best individual finish was fourth in East Germany in 1986.

External links

Soviet male Nordic combined skiers
Olympic Nordic combined skiers of the Soviet Union
Nordic combined skiers at the 1984 Winter Olympics
Living people
1959 births
FIS Nordic World Ski Championships medalists in Nordic combined